Trovato is a surname. Notable people with the surname include:

Gerardina Trovato (born 1967), Italian singer-songwriter
Mattia Trovato (born 1998), Italian football player

See also
 Ben Trovato (disambiguation)